Albania participated in the Eurovision Song Contest 2017 in Kyiv, Ukraine, with the song "World" performed by Lindita Halimi. Its selected entry was chosen through the national selection competition Festivali i Këngës organised by Radio Televizioni Shqiptar (RTSH) in December 2016. Prior to the contest, the song was promoted by a music video and live performances in Israel, the Netherlands and Spain. Albania was drawn to compete in the first semi-final of the Eurovision Song Contest, which took place on 9 May 2017. Performing as number fourth, the nation was not announced among the top 10 entries of the first semi-final and therefore failed to qualify for the grand final, marking Albania's seventh non-qualification in the contest.

Background 

The first entry was performed by Anjeza Shahini with the song "The Image of You" and finished in the seventh place, the nation's second-highest placing to date. During its tenure in the contest, Albania failed to qualify for the grand final six times, with the  entry being the most recent non-qualifier. The country's national broadcaster, Radio Televizioni Shqiptar (RTSH), organises Festivali i Këngës in order to select the nation's entry for the Eurovision Song Contest. In September 2019, the broadcaster confirmed Albania's participation in the 2017 contest in Kyiv, Ukraine.

Before Eurovision

Festivali i Këngës 

The national broadcaster of Albania, Radio Televizioni Shqiptar (RTSH), organised the 55th edition of Festivali i Këngës to determine their participant for the Eurovision Song Contest 2017. The competition consisted of two semi-finals on 21 and 22 December, respectively, and the grand final on 23 December 2016. The three live shows were hosted by Albanian singer Ledina Çelo and actor Kasem Hoxha. On 13 November, RTSH published a provisory list of 24 artists and songs shortlisted to compete in the two semi-finals of Festivali i Këngës. On 19 December 2016, it published the allocation draw of the participating contestants for each semi-final.

Competing entries 
Key:
 Withdrawn

Shows

Semi-finals 

The semi-finals of Festivali i Këngës took place on 21 December and 22 December 2016, and were broadcast at 20:30 and 21:00 (CET) on the respective dates. 12 contestants participated in each semi-final, with the highlighted ones progressing to the grand final.

Final 

The grand final of Festivali i Këngës took place on 23 December 2016 and was broadcast at 20:30 (CET). In it, the results of the competition were determined by a combination of votes from a jury panel (12/13) and a public internet vote (1/13). Before the end of the show, Lindita Halimi emerged as the winner and was simultaneously announced as the representative of Albania for the Eurovision Song Contest 2017.

Promotion 

A music video for "World" was premiered on the official YouTube channel of the Eurovision Song Contest on 13 March 2017. For further promotional purposes, Halimi embarked on a small tour with live performances at various events related to the contest, including in Amsterdam, Madrid and Tel Aviv.

At Eurovision 

The Eurovision Song Contest 2017 took place at the International Exhibition Centre in Kyiv, Ukraine, and consisted of two semi-finals held on 9 and 11 May, respectively, and the grand final on 13 May 2017.

On 31 January 2017, a special allocation draw was held in Kyiv that placed each country into one of the two semi-finals, as well as which half of the show they would perform in. Albania was placed into the first semi-final, to be held on 9 May, and was scheduled to perform in the first half of the show. Once all the competing songs for the 2017 contest had been released, the running order for the semi-finals was decided by the producers of the contest rather than through another draw, for preventing similar songs being placed next to each other; Albania was set to perform in position four, following  and preceding . At the end of the first semi-final, the country was not announced among the top 10 entries in the semi-final and therefore failed to qualify for the grand final, marking Albania's seventh non-qualification in the Eurovision Song Contest.

Voting 

The tables below visualise a breakdown of points awarded to Albania in the first semi-final of the Eurovision Song Contest 2017, as well as by the country for both the first semi-final and grand final.

Points awarded to Albania

Points awarded by Albania

Detailed voting results 
The following members comprised the Albanian jury:
 Haig Zacharian (jury chairperson)professor
 Olta Bokasinger, represented Albania in the 2008 contest
 Endri Sinacomposer
 singer
 singer (jury member in semi-final 1)
 Aulon Nacicomposer (jury member in the final)

Notes and references

Notes

References

External links 

Festivali i Këngës Official Website

2017
Countries in the Eurovision Song Contest 2017
2016
Eurovision
Eurovision